Haean Station is a station of the Daegu Subway Line 1 in Bangchon-dong, Dong District, Daegu, South Korea.

The name of station is derived from the administrative division of Haean-myeon, which became part of Daegu in 1958.

References

External links 

 DTRO virtual station

Dong District, Daegu
Daegu Metro stations
Railway stations opened in 1998